The Syr Darya electoral district was a constituency created for the 1917 Russian Constituent Assembly election. The electoral district covered the Syr-Darya Oblast, except for the Amu Darya Division.

Seven candidate lists registered to contest the election in Syr Darya; List 1 - Second Congress of Peasant Deputies, List 2 - Muslim Congress of the Syr-Darya Province, List 3 - All-Muslim List, List 4 - Mensheviks, List 5 - Kadets, List 6 - Progressives and List 7 - Socialist-Revolutionaries. List 1 and List 7 had an electoral alliance. In the autumn of 1917, a meeting of the Muslim National Committee and the Musavat Party had decided to field Alimardan Topchubashov as their candidate in Amu Darya. Alash Orda did not field a separate list in Syr-Darya, but joined with other Muslim forces for the election.

Voting in Syr-Darya was postponed until mid-Dec 1917, then to January 19, 1918. In the end no vote ever took place. 9 seats had been allotted to Syr Darya.

References

Electoral districts of the Russian Constituent Assembly election, 1917